The 1936 United States Senate election in Virginia was held on November 3, 1936. Incumbent Democratic Senator Carter Glass defeated Republican George Rohken and was elected to his fourth term in office.

Results

References

External links

Virginia
1936
1936 Virginia elections